Garland Edward Pierce (born July 9, 1953) is a  Democratic member of the North Carolina House of Representatives, who has represented the state's 48th district (including constituents in Hoke and Scotland counties) since 2005. Pierce is African-American. During the 2016 legislative session, Pierce was one of 11 Democrats to vote in favor of House Bill 2, the controversial "Bathroom Bill". He was reelected in 2020.

Committee assignments

2021-2022 Session
Appropriations 
Appropriations - Justice and Public Safety 
Commerce (Vice Chair)
Health 
Homeland Security, Military, and Veterans Affairs 
Insurance 
Energy and Public Utilities

2019-2020 Session
Appropriations 
Appropriations - Justice and Public Safety 
Commerce
Health 
Homeland Security, Military, and Veterans Affairs 
Insurance

2017-2018 Session
Appropriations
Appropriations - General Government
Commerce and Job Development
Homeland Security, Military, and Veterans Affairs (Vice Chair)
Insurance
Banking
Homelessness, Foster Care, and Dependency

2015-2016 Session
Appropriations
Appropriations - Agriculture and Natural and Economic Resources (Vice-Chair)
Commerce and Job Development
Homeland Security, Military, and Veterans Affairs (Vice-Chair)
Insurance
Banking
Children, Youth and Families

2013-2014 Session
Appropriations
Commerce and Job Development
Health and Human Services
Insurance
Public Utilities

2011-2012 Session
Appropriations
Commerce and Job Development
Health and Human Services
Insurance
Public Utilities

2009-2010 Session
Appropriations
Commerce, Small Business, and Entrepreneurship
Insurance
Aging
Federal Relations and Indian Affairs
Juvenile Justice

Electoral history

2020

2018

2016

2014

2012

2010

2008

2006

2004

References

External links
North Carolina General Assembly - Representative Garland E. Pierce official NC House website
Project Vote Smart - Representative Garland E. Pierce (NC) profile
Follow the Money - Garland E. Pierce
2008 2006 2004 campaign contributions

Living people
1953 births
People from Fayetteville, North Carolina
Politicians from Fayetteville, North Carolina
People from Laurinburg, North Carolina
Fayetteville State University alumni
Shaw University alumni
African-American state legislators in North Carolina
Democratic Party members of the North Carolina House of Representatives
21st-century American politicians
21st-century African-American politicians
20th-century African-American people